Alpha High School was a public alternative high school in Gresham, Oregon, United States. It specialized in school-to-work transition programs. It closed in 2015 due to reduced enrollment; declining demand resulted especially from improved programs at the Gresham-Barlow School District reducing student expulsions and the requirement for the alternative high school.

References

High schools in Multnomah County, Oregon
Alternative schools in Oregon
Education in Gresham, Oregon
Public middle schools in Oregon
Public high schools in Oregon
Buildings and structures in Gresham, Oregon
Defunct high schools in the United States